The 1976 Vanderbilt Commodores football team represented Vanderbilt University in the 1976 NCAA Division I football season. The Commodores were led by head coach Fred Pancoast in his second season and finished the season with a record of two wins and nine losses (2–9 overall, 0–6 in the SEC).

Schedule

Team players drafted into the NFL

References

Vanderbilt
Vanderbilt Commodores football seasons
Vanderbilt Commodores football